The Lake Nemaha Dam Guardrail, located about  miles south of Seneca, Kansas on Kansas Highway 63, was listed on the National Register of Historic Places in 2008.   It was built by the Civilian Conservation Corps in about 1937.

The guardrail runs along the highway as it crosses over the dam which formed Lake Nemaha.  The listing include 216 contributing objects:  "215 posts or pillars of quarried stone capped with three-foot square concrete blocks on the west side of the highway, and a single continuous stone parapet wall on the east side of the highway".

The Lake Nemaha Dam was built by the Civilian Conservation Corps in about 1933.  Lake Nemaha existed until 1986 when its spillway washed out.

References

Transportation buildings and structures on the National Register of Historic Places in Kansas
Buildings and structures completed in 1937
Nemaha County, Kansas